Hyriidae is a taxonomic family of pearly freshwater mussels, aquatic bivalve molluscs in the order Unionida. This family is native to South America, Australia, New Zealand and New Guinea.  Like all members of that order, they go through a larval stage that is parasitic on fish (see glochidium).

The classification recognized by Banarescu (1995) uses three subfamilies. This family contains eighteen genera.

Subfamilies and genera

Hyriinae
Genera within the subfamily Hyriinae, from South America, include:

 Paxyodon
 Castalina
 Chevronaias
 Tribe Castaliini
 Castalia
 Castaliella
 Callonaia
 Tribe Hyriini
 Prisodon
 Triplodon
 Tribe Rhipidodontini
 Diplodon

Cucumerunioninae
Genera within the subfamily Cucumerunioninae, from Australasia, include:
 Echyridella
 Cucumerunio
 Hyridella
 Virgus

Velesunioninae
Genera within the subfamily Velesunioninae, from Australasia, include:
 Alathyria
Alathyria jacksoni, the river mussel (or black river mussel) occurs in South Australia.
 Haasodonta
 Lortiella
 Microdonta
 Velesunio
 Westralunio

References

 
Bivalve families
Taxa named by William John Swainson